Events from the year 1760 in Wales.

Incumbents
Lord Lieutenant of North Wales (Lord Lieutenant of Anglesey, Caernarvonshire, Flintshire, Merionethshire, Montgomeryshire) – George Cholmondeley, 3rd Earl of Cholmondeley (until 25 October) 
Lord Lieutenant of Glamorgan – Other Windsor, 4th Earl of Plymouth
Lord Lieutenant of Brecknockshire and Lord Lieutenant of Monmouthshire – Thomas Morgan
Lord Lieutenant of Cardiganshire – Wilmot Vaughan, 3rd Viscount Lisburne
Lord Lieutenant of Carmarthenshire – George Rice
Lord Lieutenant of Denbighshire – Richard Myddelton
Lord Lieutenant of Pembrokeshire – Sir William Owen, 4th Baronet
Lord Lieutenant of Radnorshire – Howell Gwynne

Bishop of Bangor – John Egerton
Bishop of Llandaff – Richard Newcome
Bishop of St Asaph – Robert Hay Drummond
Bishop of St Davids – Anthony Ellys

Events
25 October 
The Prince of Wales succeeds his grandfather, King George II, on the throne of Great Britain.
George Cholmondeley, 3rd Earl of Cholmondeley, surrenders the lord lieutenancy of North Wales, to be replaced by a different holder in each individual county of North Wales.
Lewis Morris settles his long-standing legal appeal and is appointed JP for Cardiganshire.
Llangeitho's noted Methodist chapel is built.

Arts and literature

New books
William Lloyd - Y Sacrament a'r Aberth Cristionogol

Music

Births
4 February - Sir Charles Morgan, 2nd Baronet, soldier and politician (died 1846)
11 June - John Walters, poet (died 1789) 
6 July - Thomas Phillips, surgeon and educational benefactor (died 1851)
8 December - Morgan John Rhys, Baptist minister (died 1804)
date unknown 
Nancy Jones ("Nancy Crugybar"), hymn-writer and singer (died 1833)
David Lewis, priest and writer (died 1850)

Deaths
18 January - William Wynn, poet, 50
April - David Lewis, poet
29 April - James Davies, Independent minister
25 October - King George II of Great Britain, former Prince of Wales, 76
October - William Bulkeley, diarist, 68
date unknown - Thomas Richards, clergyman and writer

References

Wales
Wales